Prunus sargentii, commonly known as Sargent's cherry or North Japanese hill cherry, is a species of cherry native to Japan, Korea, and Sakhalin (Russia).

The tree was named for Charles Sprague Sargent.

Description

New growth is a reddish or bronze color, changing to shiny dark green. In fall, the leaves turn red, orange, or yellow. It grows single pink flowers on 1-in pedicels, which result in purple-black fruit in summer. The fruits are a favorite of birds, but because of their size (small, pea sized) and color, are considered inconspicuous to humans.

Cultivation
P. sargentii is a fast-growing ornamental tree requiring sun and well-drained soil. The tree can tolerate wind, but not air pollution; it is one of the hardiest cherries, and can be easily transplanted. This makes it suitable for use as a street tree. The tree is moderately drought-tolerant.

History
Native to Korea and Japan, the tree was introduced to America and then the United Kingdom in 1908.

Gallery

See also
For cherry blossoms and their cultural significance to the Japanese, see sakura.

References

 Common Trees of Hokkaido, Hokkaido University Press, Sapporo, 1992,  C0045 P2472E

External links
 
 Prunus sargentii images at the Arnold Arboretum of Harvard University Plant Image Database
 "Cherry: Prunus ssp. - April Tree of the Month." Arnold Arboretum of Harvard University website, 2015. Accessed 1 May 2020.

Cherry blossom
sargentii
Flora of Japan
Trees of Korea
Flora of Primorsky Krai
Flora of Sakhalin
Ornamental trees